Zaheer Haniff (born 13 April 1974) is a Guyanese cricketer. He played in eleven first-class and two List A matches for Guyana from 1994 to 2000.

See also
 List of Guyanese representative cricketers

References

External links
 

1974 births
Living people
Guyanese cricketers
Guyana cricketers